Agouron may refer to:

 Agouron Institute, a non-profit research organization that sponsors research in biology
 Agouron Pharmaceuticals, a subsidiary of Pfizer